Cái Dầu is an urban municipality (thị trấn thuộc huyện) and capital town of the Châu Phú District of An Giang Province, Vietnam.

Communes of An Giang province
Populated places in An Giang province
District capitals in Vietnam
Townships in Vietnam